Adios Pick (born in 1954) is a champion Standardbred trotting horse. He was a foal of Adios and Pick Up.

Adios Pick was bred in Ontario, Canada. After an injury prematurely ended his racing career, he became a profiled sire. His offspring amassed earnings of $18.8 million in stakes racing.

Adios Pick was inducted into the Canadian Horse Racing Hall of Fame in 1989, thirteen years after his full sister Dotties Pick.

References
 Adios Pick's page at the Canadian Horse Racing Hall of Fame

See also
Harness racing

1954 racehorse births
1987 racehorse deaths
Canadian Standardbred racehorses